{{Album ratings
| rev1      = AllMusic
| rev1Score =  
| rev2      = The Encyclopedia of Popular Music
| rev2Score = 
}}The Young Mods' Forgotten Story is an album by the American soul music group the Impressions. It was released in 1969 via Curtom Records.

Production
Donny Hathaway worked as an arranger on the album.

Critical receptionBillboard deemed The Young Mods' Forgotten Story a "smooth soul sampler of choice tunes." Colin Larkin called it "quintessential," writing that it "set the framework for [Curtis Mayfield's] solo work." The Edmonton Journal'', reviewing a reissue, wrote that "the music, save for touches of wah-wah and (prescient) proto-funk on 'Mighty Mighty', was in many ways a step behind similar groups of the time."

Track listing
All tracks composed by Curtis Mayfield
 "The Young Mods' Forgotten Story"  – 2:00
 "Choice of Colors"  – 3:15
 "The Girl I Find"  – 2:37
 "Wherever You Leadeth Me"  – 2:32
 "My Deceiving Heart"  – 2:49
 "Seven Years"  – 2:21
 "Love's Miracle"  – 2:24
 "Jealous Man"  – 2:34
 "Soulful Love"  – 2:30
 "Mighty Mighty (Spade & Whitey)"  – 2:21

Personnel 
 Curtis Mayfield – lead vocals, guitar, producer
 Fred Cash and Sam Gooden – backing vocals
 The Funk Brothers – instrumentation
 Donny Hathaway and Johnny Pate – arranger

Charts
USA - Album

USA - Singles

References

1969 albums
The Impressions albums
Albums arranged by Johnny Pate
Albums produced by Curtis Mayfield
Curtom Records albums